Mysore district, officially Mysuru district is an administrative district located in the southern part of the state of Karnataka, India. It is the administrative headquarters of Mysore division.Chamarajanagar District was carved out of the original larger Mysore District in the year 1998. The district is bounded by Chamrajanagar district to the southeast, Mandya district to the east and northeast, Kerala state to the south, Kodagu district to the west, and Hassan district to the north.

This district has a prominent place in the history of Karnataka; Mysore was ruled by the Wodeyars from the year 1399 till the independence of India in the year 1947. It features many tourist destinations, from Mysore Palace to Nagarhole National Park. It is the third-most populous district in Karnataka (out of 31), after Bangalore Urban.

Etymology
Mysore district gets its name from the city of Mysore which is also the headquarters of the district. The original name of this city was Mahishapura derived from a demon named Mahishasura. A statue of Mahishasura, after whom the city is named, and a temple dedicated to Goddess Chamundeshwari on the top of Chamundi Hill near Mysore city, relate to the legend of its origin.

History

The earliest known reference of rulers in Mysore district are the Gangas who during the rule of King Avinitha (469-529 CE), moved the capital from Kolar to Talakadu on the banks of the river Kaveri in the Tirumakudalu Narasipura taluk. Talakadu remained their regal capital till the end of Ganga rule in the early 11th century. Gangas ruled over a greater part of Mysore district, then known by the name of Gangavadi. In the end of the 8th century, the Rashtrakuta king Dhruva Dharavarsha defeated the Ganga king Shivamara II and wrested Gangavadi from him. Gangavadi came under the governorship of Kambarasa, the son of Dhruva Dharavarsha. Gangas who were overthrown from Gangavadi, had to wait till their king Nitimarga Ereganga (853–869 CE) won a victory against the Rashtrakutas at Rajaramudu. Seeing the increasing might of the Gangas, the Rashtrakuta King Amoghavarsha I gave his daughter Revakanimmadi in marriage to the son of Ereganga, Butuga II who became the ruler of Gangavadi. Gangas ruled over Gangavadi till the Ganga king, Rakkasa Ganga (985–1024 CE) was defeated by the Cholas.

In the year 1117, Vishnuvardhana, the great king of Hoysala dynasty seized Gangavathi and its capital Talakad from the Cholas. To commemorate this achievement, Vishnuvardhana built the Keerthinarayana temple at Talakad. Gangavadi was ruled by the Hoysalas till the death of their last ruler, Veera Ballala III after which Gangavadi became a part of the Vijayanagara Empire. In 1399, Yaduraya established the Wodeyar dynasty at Mysore. It remained as a feudatory to the Vijayanagara Empire owing allegiance to the Vijayanagara kings and the Vijayanagara representative at Srirangapatna, till the fall of the Vijayanagara Empire in 1565 CE. In the vacuum that was created, Raja Wodeyar I (1578–1617) established control and became the first major ruler of the Wodeyar family. He defeated the Vijayanagara representative in a battle at Kesare near Mysore, shifted his capital from Mysore to Srirangapatna in 1610 AD.

The Wodeyars continued to rule over Mysore till the reign of Krishnaraja Wodeyar II (1734–1766), when Hyder Ali Khan and his son Tipu Sultan became the virtual rulers of Mysore. Though there were Wodeyar kings during the rule of Hyder Ali and Tipu Sultan, they were mere figureheads. With the death of Tipu Sultan in 1799 under the hands of the British, the Wodeyars were reinstated to the throne of Mysore and the capital was shifted back to Mysore. Prince Krishnaraja Wodeyar III who was just 5 years old was installed on the throne of Mysore in 1799. Wodeyars were the subsidiaries of the British Empire and had to pay annual subsidies. During the rule of Krishnaraja Wodeyar III, the British took the kingdom back from Wodeyars in 1831 under the pretext that the Wodeyar king did not pay the annual subsidy. Commissioners were appointed to rule over the Mysore kingdom. Mark Cubbon (Cubbon Road and Cubbon Park in Bangalore city are named after him) and L. B. Bowring (Bowring Hospital in Bangalore city is named after him) were the prominent British Commissioners who ruled over Mysore. However, the Wodeyar kings raised a plea against this with the British Parliament who gave a ruling favour of the Wodeyars. In 1881, Chamaraja Wodeyar IX (son of Krishnaraja Wodeyar III and Wodeyar king since 1868) was given back the reins of the Mysore kingdom from the British. The Wodeyars continued to rule over the Mysore Kingdom, till the rule of Jayachamaraja Wodeyar who, in the year 1947, merged his kingdom into the new dominion of independent India. He remained as a Maharaja till India became a republic in the year 1950 after which he was anointed as a Raja Pramukh (a constitutional position) as the head of Mysore state till 1956. In 1956, after the reorganisation of Indian states, the Mysore state was born and Jayachamaraja Wodeyar was made as the governor of this state – the position he held until 1964.

Geography
Mysore district is located between latitude 11°45' to 12°40' N and longitude 75°57' to 77°15' E. It is bounded by Mandya district to the northeast, Chamrajanagar district to the southeast, Kerala state to the south, Kodagu district to the west, and Hassan district to the north. It has an area of 6,854 km2 (ranked 12th in the state). The administrative center of Mysore District is Mysore City. The district is a part of Mysore division. Prior to 1998, Mysore district also contained the Chamarajanagar district before that area was separated off.

The district lies on the undulating table land of the southern Deccan plateau, within the watershed of the Kaveri River, which flows through the northwestern and eastern parts of the district. The Krishna Raja Sagara reservoir, which was formed by building a dam across the Kaveri, lies on the northern edge of the district. Nagarhole National Park lies partly in Mysore district and partly in adjacent Kodagu District.

Mountains are rare in the district, only isolated peaks are present, namely Chamundi Hill(1030metres above MSL) and Sidilu Mallikarjuna Hill Temple (1320m above MSL), Bettadapura in Periyapatna Taluk, latter being the highest mountain peak in the Mysore district.

Climate
The temperature in the district varies from 15 °C in winters to 35 °C in summers. Mysore district receives an average rainfall of 785 mm.

Geology
The types of soil found in this district are red soils (red gravelly loam soil, red loam soil, red gravelly clay soil, red clay soil), lateritic soil, deep black soil, saline alluvio-colluvial soil and brown forest soil. Some of the minerals found in this district are kyanite, sillimanite, quartz, magnesite, chromite, soapstone, felsite, corundum, graphite, limestone, dolomite, siliconite and dunite

Economy

Agriculture is the backbone of the economy of this district as it is with the rest of India. Though the agriculture is highly dependent on the rainfall, the rivers Kaveri and Kabini provide the irrigation needs required for agriculture in this district. According to the 2001 census, about 3,25,823 farmers are involved in cultivation in this district. In the year 2001–2002, Mysore district yielded a foodgrain production of 608,596 Tonnes which is a contribution of 6.94% of the total food grain production in the state for the year. Some of the important crops grown here are cotton, grams, groundnut, jowar, maize, ragi, rice, sugarcane, sunflower and tur. Horticulture is another area contributing significantly to the economy; especially the palm oil production in H D Kote Taluk.

Industries

Industries in Mysore district are mainly concentrated around the cities of Mysore and Nanjangud. Karnataka Industrial Areas Development Board (KIADB) has established two industrial estates as Mysore and Nanjangud and established six industrial areas in Mysore district to encourage Industrial Development of the district. These are located at Belagola, Belawadi, Hebbal (Electronic City) and Hootagalli of Mysore Industrial estate and the industrial areas Nanjangud and Thandavapura of Nanjangud industrial estate.

The first major industry to be set up in Mysore with the partnership of the Maharaja of Mysore when Mysore was still an industrially backward district in 1960 was the now defunct Ideal Jawa India Ltd. Motorcycle factory with technical collaboration with Jawa Motors of Czechoslovakia.

Some of the major industries located near Mysore city are:
 Mysore Polymers & Rubber Products Ltd. (MYPOL) - Manufacturer of Rubber Products
 JK Tyres Ltd. - Manufacturer of tyres
 Automotive Axles Ltd. - Manufacturer of axles
 Bharat Earth Movers Ltd. (BEML) - Manufacturer of heavy machinery
 Karnataka Silk Industries Corporation (KSIC) - Manufacturer of silk garments
 TVS Ltd. - Manufacturer of motor vehicles and parts (Near Nanjangud, Mysore Taluk)
 Larsen & Toubro (Manufacturer of medical equipments and Electronic meters)

Some of the major industries located in Nanjangud are:
 Dunford Fabrics (Closed)
 VKC Sandals (India) Private Limited
 Nestle India Ltd.
 Ray Hans Technologies
 AT&S India Pvt Ltd.
 TVS Motor Company
 Bannari Amman Sugars Ltd.
 South India Paper Mills
 Indus Fila
 S Kumars Now --> Reid & Taylor
 Raman Boards
 REI Electronics
 Jubilant Life sciences limited
 Brakes (India)
 Bacardi RUM, Gemini Distilleries Pvt Ltd.
 Zenith Textiles
 Kottakal Arya Vaidyasala
 Supreem Pharmaceuticals Mysore Pvt Ltd.,
 ITC (Tobacco Processing)
 United Breweries (Upcoming)

Information technology
Mysore is proving to be the next IT hub in Karnataka after the phenomenal success of Bangalore. The government of India has recognised Mysore as number one among the 20 Tier II cities of India for the promotion of the IT industry. Currently, all of the IT related industries are concentrated around Mysore city. The Software Technology Park (STP) in Mysore was inaugurated in 1998 by the prime minister of India, Atal Bihari Vajpayee. As of August 2006, there are 42 companies registered with the STP. Software exports from Mysore were expected to double to about Rs. 850 crores in the financial year 2006-07 from previous year's exports of Rs. 400 crores. Some of the major IT companies located here are:
 Wipro Infotech
 Aris Global Pvt Ltd
 WeP Peripherals Ltd. (earlier known as Wipro ePeripherals Ltd.)
 Infosys
 Software Paradigms (India)
 Larsen & Toubro
 Infomaze

Tourism

Tourism is another big industry in Mysore. Its importance as a tourist destination was evident when it was selected as the venue for the Karnataka Tourism Expo in 2006. Though Mysore city is well known as a tourist place, other parts the district are yet to see growth in tourism. However, the tourism department plans to develop other areas like Nanjangud, Bettadapura, Hedathali, Kapadi, Mudukuthore Betta, Mugur and Tirumakudalu Narasipura as tourist places.

Administration

Mysore district is divided into three subdivisions, Nanjangud, Mysore and Hunsur. The Mysore district administration is headed by the Deputy Commissioner who also has the additional role of a District Magistrate. Assistant Commissioners, Tahsildars, Shirastedars (revenue official at Tahsil level), Revenue inspectors and Village Accountants help the Deputy Commissioner in the administration of the district. Mysore city is the headquarters of the district. It lies on the north eastern part of the district and is well known for its beautiful palaces and also for the festivities that take place during Dasara.

Mysore District is subdivided into nine taluks:
 Piriyapatna 
 Hunsur 
 Krishnarajanagara 
 Mysore 
 Heggadadevanakote 
 Nanjangud 
 Saragur
 Tirumakudalu Narasipura
Saligrama

Mysore district has 1 Municipal Corporation, 3 City Municipal Councils, 5 Town Municipal Councils and 6 Town Panchayats.

 Mysore City Corporation
 Hootagalli CMC
 Hunasuru CMC
 Nanjangud CMC
 K.R Nagar TMC
 T.Narsipura TMC
 Bannur TMC
 H.D Kote TMC
 Periyapatna TMC
 Bogadhi TP
 Rammanahalli TP
 Srirampura TP
 Kadakola TP
 Saragur TP
 Saligrama TP

Mysore district elects 11 members to the Legislative Assembly of the State of Karnataka. The 11 assembly constituencies are:
 Chamaraja, Krishnaraja, Narasimharaja and Chamundeshwari (belonging to Mysore city)
 Varuna (belonging to Nanjangud and Tirumakudalu Narasipura)
 Hunsur
 Piriyapatna
 Krishnarajanagara
 Heggadadevanakote
 Nanjangud
 Tirumakudalu Narasipura

Mysore district also elects 1 member to the Lok Sabha, the lower house of the Indian Parliament. The Mysore Lok Sabha constituency consists of all the Assembly constituencies mentioned above except for Nanjangud, Tirumakudalu Narasipura, K.R.Nagara and H.D.Kote which belong to the Chamarajanagar Lok Sabha constituency.

Demographics
According to the 2011 census Mysore district has a population of 3,001,127, roughly equal to the nation of Armenia or the US state of Mississippi. This gives it a ranking of 125th in India (out of a total of 640). Its population growth rate over the decade 2001-2011 was 13.39%. Mysore has a sex ratio of 982 females for every 1000 males, and a literacy rate of 72.56%. Scheduled Castes and Scheduled Tribes make up 17.88% and 11.15% of the population respectively. Some of the more ancient forest tribes are Jenu Kuruba, Betta Kuruba, Paniya, Yereva and Soliga.

Hindus constitute 87.70% of the population with Muslims making up 9.68% of the population; the remaining part of the population is made up by Christians, Buddhists and other religious groups.

At the time of the 2011 census, 80.81% of the population spoke Kannada, 9.27% Urdu, 2.91% Telugu, 2.22% Tamil, and 1.12% Hindi as their first language.

List of Deputy Commissioners

Gallery

See also
Nanjangud

References

External links

 www.Mysore.ind.in
 Official Website of Mysore district
 Mysore City Portal
Mysore Media

 
Districts of Karnataka